The FIA WTCC Race of Sweden was a round of the World Touring Car Championship, which was held at the Scandinavian Raceway in Anderstorp, Sweden during the 2007 season.

The race was introduced in 2007, replacing the Race of Turkey. Although the Swedish race was on the original 2008 calendar, it was canceled following a request from the Swedish National Sporting Authority after the WTCC failed to reach a commercial agreement with the event's promoters.

Winners

References

Sweden
World Touring Car Championship